Than Quang Ninh Football Club, simply known as Than Quang Ninh or TQN, was a professional football club, based in Cẩm Phả, Quảng Ninh Province, Vietnam.

They last played in the V.League 1 in 2021 and were sponsored by Vinacomin. They were omitted from V-League competitions for 2022, after loss of their main sponsor and other financial difficulties.

Final squad
As of November 2021

Kit suppliers and shirt sponsors

Honours

National competitions
League
V.League 2:
 Runners-up : 2010, 2013
Second League:
 Runners-up :  2006
Cup
Vietnamese Cup:
 Winners : 2016
Vietnamese Super Cup:
 Winners : 2016

Continental record

Season-by-season record

References

External links
Official site

Football clubs in Vietnam
1956 establishments in Vietnam
Association football clubs established in 1956
Mining association football clubs in Vietnam
Association football clubs disestablished in 2021